Dallington is a former village about  northwest of the centre of Northampton, the county town of Northamptonshire, England. Dallington is now a suburb of Northampton. At the 2011 census the population was listed in the Spencer ward of Northampton Council.

The villages name means 'farm/settlement connected with Daegel'.

The Church of England parish church of Saint Mary the Virgin dates from 1207 and is a Grade II* listed building. It is near the site of a previous Saxon church.

Dallington Hall on Dallington Park Road is a Grade II* listed house built in 1720-30 for Sir Joseph Jekyll, Master of the Rolls in place of the original manor house owned by the Rainsford family (see Richard Raynsford). It was later owned by Earl Spencer before becoming a hospital known as the Margaret Spencer Home of Rest.  It has now been divided into private apartments.

There was a short lived attempt to quarry iron ore in the parish in the early 1860s. The quarry ceased operation by 1863. It was on the west side of the railway to the north of Northampton Station and the site is now built over or covered by railway sidings. It had a horse -worked tramway to take the ore to the railway.

Dallington is north-east of Duston, south of Kings Heath and north-west of St James End.

References

External links

 

Areas of Northampton